Live at the BBC is a live album by South African trumpeter Hugh Masekela. It contains the tracks recorded on 23 June 1985 at the Glastonbury Festival in England and on 16 November 1988 at the Nelson Mandela Concert. The album was released on 23 April 2002 via Varèse Sarabande label.

Reception
Matt Collar of AllMusic noted: "Featuring many songs off his 1985 release, Waiting for the Rain, the songs liberally combine disco, soul, and jazz with Afro-pop, all with a strong anti-apartheid stance. Songs such as 'Politician' and 'Serhasa' deal directly with governmental corruption in Africa, while others, such as the jubilant 'Zulu Wedding,' merely hint at the ennui of apartheid while focusing on the happiness of marriage. With Masekela's catchy melodies, this stuff has a lot in common with other African-influenced pop of the '80s by Western artists such as David Byrne and Paul Simon, yet retains a purist appeal."

Track listing

References

External links

2002 live albums
Hugh Masekela albums
BBC Radio recordings